Sutta may refer to:

Sutta Nipata, is a Buddhist scripture
Sutta Piṭaka, The second of the three divisions of the Tripitaka or Pali Canon
Sutta Pazham, is a 2008 Indian Tamil language adult comedy thriller film
Sutta Kadhai, 2013 Indian Tamil-language black comedy film
The Pali version of the Sanskrit term Sutra
In Buddhism, a discourse of the Buddha: see Sutra and List of suttas